
Choszczno County is a unit of territorial administration and local government (powiat) in West Pomeranian Voivodeship, north-western Poland. It came into being on January 1, 1999, as a result of the Polish local government reforms passed in 1998.

As of 2006 its total population is 50,066, out of which the population of Choszczno is 15,753, that of Recz is 2,995, that of Pełczyce is 2,698, that of Drawno is 2,399, and the rural population is 26,221.

The county includes the lake districts of Pojezierze Choszczeńskie, Pojezierze Myśliborskie, Pojezierze Ińskie and Równina Drawska. Within Gmina Drawno is a large forest (Puszcza Drawska) which is part of the Drawno National Park.

Neighbouring counties
Choszczno County is bordered by Drawsko County to the north, Wałcz County to the east, Strzelce-Drezdenko County to the south, Myślibórz County to the south-west and Stargard County to the north-west.

Administrative division
The county is subdivided into six gminas (four urban-rural and two rural). These are listed in the following table, in descending order of population.

Transport

Railways 
in use: Szczecin Gł. - Poznań Gł. (through Choszczno and Bierzwnik).
unused, existing: Stargard Szczeciński - Piła Główna (through Recz Pomorski) and Barlinek - Kalisz Pomorski (through Pełczyce, Lubiana Pyrzycka, Choszczno and Drawno).
unused, non-existing: Lubiana Pyrzycka - Strzelce Krajeńskie.

Roads 
national grade: 10: Lubieszyn - Płońsk (through Recz).
voivodship grade: 151: Recz - Świdwin, 155: Recz - Gorzów Wielkopolski (through Choszczno and Pełczyce), 160: Suchań - Miedzichowo (through Choszczno and Bierzwnik), 161: Choszczno - Kalisz Pomorski (through Drawno), 122: Piasecznik - Krajnik Dolny.

References
Polish official population figures 2006

 
Choszczno